Jason Bakker (born 12 November 1967) is an Australian former cricketer. He played eleven first-class cricket matches for Victoria between 1995 and 2000.

In 2007 Bakker founded a sports management company, Signature Sports, and is the manager of cyclist Cadel Evans, among other athletes.

See also
 List of Victoria first-class cricketers

References

External links
 

1967 births
Living people
Australian cricketers
Victoria cricketers
Cricketers from Geelong